Qahramon is a village in Sirdaryo Region, Uzbekistan. Until 2004 it was the seat of the Mehnatobod District; when this district was abolished, Qahramon became part of the Xovos District.

References

Populated places in Sirdaryo Region